Annangrove  is a suburb of Sydney, in the state of New South Wales, Australia 42 kilometres north-west of the Sydney central business district in the local government area of The Hills Shire and part of the Hills District region.

History
Annangrove is named after Annangrove House, the home of Edward Charles Johnston, a grandson of George Johnston who had received a large grant in present-day Annandale. He had named his house Annandale, after his birthplace Annan in Scotland and his grandson also used the name for his house in this area. Timber cutting was the first industry in the area, with the land later used for orchards from the 1880s. Edward Johnston bought his land in 1893 from Bennett William Johns. The post office took the Annangrove name from his house when it opened on 16 October 1895, as did the school in 1896.

Places of worship
Sydney Zoroastrian Fire Temple is located at 196 Annangrove Road.
Imam Hasan Centre, a Muslim prayer centre (Hussainia) for Shia Muslims in Sydney, opened 16 October 2004.

Demographics
The most common responses for religious affiliation were Catholic 38.7%, Anglican 17.7% and No Religion 14.9%.

References

Suburbs of Sydney
The Hills Shire